Jim Higgins may refer to:

 Jim Higgins (basketball) (1918–2002), American professional basketball player
 Jim Higgins (boxer) (1897–1964), Scottish boxer of the 1910s, 1920s  and 1930s
 Jim Higgins (British politician) (1930–2002), British revolutionary socialist
 Jim Higgins (ice hockey), American retired ice hockey player and coach
 Jim Higgins (Irish politician) (born 1945), Irish Fine Gael politician, served in Seanad Éireann, Dáil Éireann and the European Parliament
 Jim Higgins (footballer) (born 1926), Irish soccer player
 Jim Higgins (luger) (born 1936), American Olympic luger
 Jim Higgins (rugby league) (born 1920s), professional rugby league footballer

See also
 James Higgins (disambiguation)